Guarda railway station is a railway station in the village of Guarda, within the municipality of Scuol, in the Swiss canton of Grisons. It is an intermediate stop on the  gauge Bever–Scuol-Tarasp line of the Rhaetian Railway.

Services
The following services stop at Guarda:

 RegioExpress: hourly service between Disentis/Mustér and Scuol-Tarasp.

References

External links
 
 

Railway stations in Graubünden
Rhaetian Railway stations
Railway stations in Switzerland opened in 1913